Nyman's model was developed by John A. Nyman beginning in 1999 and presents an alternative view of moral hazard in the context of private health insurance in the United States.  Nyman is a professor of Economics at the University of Minnesota.  

His theory proposes that private health insurance is purchased because consumers want to transfer income from their healthy state to their ill state where it is more valuable to them.  Insurance takes advantage of the fact that not all purchasers of insurance become ill during the same contract year.  For example, say that a certain healthcare procedure costs $100,000, but each person has only a 1 in 50,000 chance of becoming ill and needing that procedure in a year.  The consumer is therefore able to purchase full coverage for that procedure for only $2, or a little more, because for every 1 person who becomes ill, there are 49,999 other consumers who pay into the insurance pool and remain healthy.  Thus, insurance acts both to transfer $2 of the consumer's income to the consumer's ill state, and also to augment that income [by $100,000 - $2 = $99,998] in that state.

The insurer transfers income from the healthy to the ill.  This income transfer is typically accomplished by the insurer paying for the insured patient's care out of the pool of premiums that are paid to the insurer by both those who remain healthy and those who become ill.  Moral hazard, the additional healthcare consumed because of insurance, can be decomposed into an efficient (welfare increasing) portion and an inefficient (welfare decreasing) one, based on what the insured patient would have done with the income if they had been written a cashier's check for the insurance spending, instead of the insurer purchasing the healthcare for them.  To the extent that the insured patient would have purchased more care with the additional income, this would represent the efficient portion of moral hazard.  To the extent that the insured patient is responding to the lower effective price of healthcare (because the insurer is paying for the care), this would represent the inefficient portion of moral hazard.  

For example, assume Elizabeth contracts breast cancer.  Without insurance, assume she would purchase a mastectomy for $20,000.  With insurance that pays for all her care, assume she would purchase a mastectomy for $20,000, a breast reconstruction for $20,000, plus 2 extra days in the hospital to recover for $4,000.  Moral hazard (the additional care she purchases with insurance) is represented by the $20,000 breast reconstruction and $4,000 for 2 extra days in the hospital.  To determine whether this moral hazard is efficient or inefficient, it would be necessary to present Elizabeth with a cashier's check for the income that came from the insurance pool to pay for her care ($20,000 + $20,000 + $4,000 = $44,000) and see what she would purchase.  Assume that with her original income (minus the premium paid) plus $44,000, she would purchase the $20,000 mastectomy and the $20,000 breast reconstruction, but not the 2 extra days in the hospital for $4,000.  Because she could have purchased anything of her choosing with the additional $44,000 and chose to purchase the $20,000 breast reconstruction, we know that this portion of moral hazard is welfare increasing and efficient.  That is, it was worth the $20,000 that was spent.  Because she did not purchase the 2 extra days in the hospital to recover for $4,000, we know that this portion of moral hazard is welfare decreasing and was only purchased with her original insurance because the insurer was paying for all her care.  

The inefficient portion of moral hazard represents a transactions cost for using a price reduction (if insurance pays for all care, the price of healthcare to the insured patient has dropped to $0) to transfer income to Elizabeth.  That same amount of income could have been transferred by a cashier's check, but it would probably require even greater transactions costs because of the need to monitor for insurance fraud and to write complex legal contracts.  As a result, the inefficient moral hazard can be ignored.

Conventional theory holds that health insurance is purchased because consumers are adverse to risk, and that all of moral hazard is inefficient.  Nyman's model holds that insurance is purchased in order to obtain an income transfer in the ill state.  This income allows for the purchase of additional healthcare when ill, efficient moral hazard.  Health insurance is also purchased because it often allows consumers to gain access to healthcare that they would not otherwise be able to afford.  This access value of health insurance is an important reason for the demand for insurance.

References

Nyman, John A. “The Value of Health Insurance: The Access Motive,” Journal of Health Economics vol. 18, no. 2, April 1999, pp. 141-152.

Nyman, John A.  “The Economics of Moral Hazard Revisited,” Journal of Health Economics vol. 18, no. 6, December 1999, pp. 811-824.

Nyman, John A.  “The Theory of the Demand for Health Insurance.” University of Minnesota, Department of Economics Discussion Paper #311, March 2001.

Nyman, John A.  The Theory of Demand for Health Insurance.  Stanford, CA: Stanford University Press, 2003.

Santerre, Rexford E., and Neun, Stephen P. Health Economics: Theories, Insights, and Industry Studies. 4th ed. Thomas South-Western, 2007. 63-65, 142-46.

Santerre, Rexford E., and Neun, Stephen P.  Health Economics: Theories, Insights, and Industry Studies.  6th ed. Thomas South-Wester, 2013. 167-174.

Health insurance in the United States